Akfen Holding, is a Turkey-based and infrastructure investments oriented holding company which was founded in 1976 by Hamdi Akın and earned its status as a holding in 1999.

Industrial Branches in which the Company Is Active

 Airport Management and Operations
 Construction
 Port Operations
 Marine Transportation
 Water Distribution and Waste Water Utilities
 Energy
 Real Estate

National and International Partners

Creates enormous synergy with pioneering global partners such as;

 Tepe Construction Industry Inc.
 PSA International
 Souter Investment LLP
 Kardan N.V.
 Accor SA

Akfen Holding was offered publicly in 2010 and is on the trade list of Borsa Istanbul (BIST)

Free Float Rate %28.26

Share Code; AKFEN

Area of activity 

Main Subsidiary Companies;
 Akfen Construction
 Akfen REIT
 HEPP Group
 Other (Akfen Energy Holding, Sim-Er Energy)

Investments Valued by Equity Method;
 TAV Airports
 TAV Investment
 Mersin International Port Management / MIP
 Istanbul Fast Ferries  / İDO
 Akfen Water
 PSA Akfen Port Operations and Management Consultancy

Board of directors

Social responsibility 
Turkey Human Resources Foundation (TİKAV) was founded in 1999. TIKAV, which was founded by the Akin Family, conducts studies on bringing up socially and culturally well-equipped youngsters that are studying in the universities of the East and Southeast Region of Turkey, and raising the leaders of the future. The Foundation actualizes Akfen Holding’s social responsibility projects.

References 

Holding companies of Turkey
Turkish brands